Pattaya Dolphins United Football Club , is a Thai football club based in Chonburi, Thailand. The club is currently playing in the Thai League 3 Eastern region. In 2021, the new owner decided to change the club's name from Pattaya Discovery United F.C. to Pattaya Dolphins United F.C.. Apart from the club's name, the club's logo is also changed. These changes will be applied for the 2021-22 season onward.

Record

Honours

Domestic leagues
 Thai League 3 Eastern Region
 Winners (2): 2021–22, 2022–23

Club staff

Players

Current squad

References

 https://khaosod.co.th/view_newsonline.php?newsid=1470465866
 http://idewblog.net/0203558000828.html

External links
 website
 

Association football clubs established in 2015
Football clubs in Thailand
2015 establishments in Thailand